Ginahgulla, also known as Fairfax House, is a historic house in the Sydney suburb of Bellevue Hill, New South Wales, Australia. Completed in 1858 in the Victorian Free Gothic style, Ginahgulla and its gardens are listed on the (now defunct) Australian Register of the National Estate and the Municipality of Woollahra local government heritage list.

History

This two-storey Gothic house is situated on the south side of Ginahgulla Road. It was built in 1858 by John Fairfax, of the Fairfax family of newspaper proprietors. It may have been designed by Edmund Blacket, who was otherwise distinguished as an ecclesiastical architect, responsible for many churches in the Sydney area. The Fairfax family used the house until 1945, when it was bought by the nearby independent school, The Scots College. The College uses the house as a boarding house and is sometimes known as "the house on the hill."

References

Houses completed in 1858
Victorian architecture in Sydney
Houses in Bellevue Hill, New South Wales
New South Wales places listed on the defunct Register of the National Estate
1858 establishments in Australia
Fairfax family (publishers)
Edmund Blacket buildings in Sydney
New South Wales Heritage Database